The 2006 Belarusian Premier League was the 16th season of top-tier football in Belarus. It started on April 18 and ended on November 4, 2005. Shakhtyor Soligorsk were the defending champions.

Team changes from 2005 season
Two lowest placed in 2004 teams (Zvezda-BGU Minsk and Slavia) relegated to First League. They were replaced by the winners of 2005 First League Belshina Bobruisk and First League runners-up Lokomotiv Vitebsk. Dnepr-Transmash Mogilev shortened their name to Dnepr Mogilev.

Overview
BATE Borisov won their 3rd champions title and qualified for the next season's Champions League. The championship runners-up Dinamo Minsk and 2006–07 Cup winners Dinamo Brest qualified for UEFA Cup. Lokomotiv Minsk and Belshina Bobruisk, who finished on last two places, relegated to the First League.

Teams and venues

Table

Results

Belarusian clubs in European Cups

Top scorers

See also
2006 Belarusian First League
2005–06 Belarusian Cup
2006–07 Belarusian Cup

External links
RSSSF

Belarusian Premier League seasons
1
Belarus
Belarus